Sher Bahadur Singh (died January 19, 2020) was an Indian politician in Uttar Pradesh. He served 5 times as Member of the Legislative Assembly (India) Uttar Pradesh for Jalalpur (Assembly constituency). He was firstly elected member of Uttar Pradesh Legislative Assembly for  Jalalpur constituency  in  1980 from Indian National Congress,  in 1985 as Independent, in 1996 from Bharatiya Janata Party, in 2002 from Bahujan Samaj Party, in 2012 from Samajwadi Party.

He was once a member of the Bahujan Samaj Party, but left that party after it decided not to field him as a candidate in the forthcoming election and joined the Samajwadi Party on July 25, 2011.

Singh died on 19 January 2020 due to an age-related illness.

Controversies
In 2007, tailoring shops were found in garages rented  by several members of the Uttar Pradesh Legislative Assembly, including Singh.

In 2007, fighting broke out between Singh's bodyguards and some uninvited journalists at the wedding of Singh's nephew, Pawan Singh.

References

Members of the Uttar Pradesh Legislative Assembly
Samajwadi Party politicians
2020 deaths
1941 births
Indian National Congress politicians from Uttar Pradesh
Bharatiya Janata Party politicians from Uttar Pradesh
Bahujan Samaj Party politicians from Uttar Pradesh
Samajwadi Party politicians from Uttar Pradesh